Acantholycosa petrophila is a species of wolf spider only known from the western Sayan Mountains in Khakassia, Russia.

This dark grey spider, up to 8.5 mm in length, can only be separated from its closest congener, Acantholycosa khakassica by details of the genitalia.

References

Lycosidae
Spiders described in 2003
Spiders of Russia